West Point is an unincorporated community in Upper Gwynedd Township, Montgomery County, Pennsylvania. Zacharias Creek starts here and flows west into the Skippack Creek, a tributary of the Perkiomen Creek. Merck & Co. has a facility in West Point, which is split between the Lansdale and North Wales post offices with the ZIP codes of 19446 and 19454, respectively.  It is part of the North Penn Valley region that is centered on the borough of Lansdale.

References

Unincorporated communities in Montgomery County, Pennsylvania
Unincorporated communities in Pennsylvania